Patrick Quivrin (born 6 November 1952) is a French fencer. He competed in the individual and team sabre events at the 1976 Summer Olympics.

References

External links
 

1952 births
Living people
French male sabre fencers
Olympic fencers of France
Fencers at the 1976 Summer Olympics